Spasskoye is a rural locality (a village) in Podlesnensky Selsoviet, Sterlitamaksky District, Bashkortostan, Russia. The population was 16 as of 2010. There is 1 street.

Geography 
Spasskoye is located 31 km north of Sterlitamak (the district's administrative centre) by road. Talalayevka is the nearest rural locality.

References 

Rural localities in Sterlitamaksky District